markets.com, is a global trading brand owned by Finalto Group. markets.com is an electronic trading platform for trading on the foreign exchange market, commodity market, cryptocurrency market, stock market (both indices and individual stocks), ETFs and bonds through Contracts for Difference (CFDs) and in the UK & Ireland, Spread Bets along with CFDs.

The markets.com brand is operated by a number of regulated entities which are part of the Finalto Group for doing business globally. The brand is operated by its 5 companies which are regulated individually by the Financial Conduct Authority (FCA) in the UK, the Cyprus Securities and Exchange Commission (CySEC) in Cyprus. the Financial Conduct Authority (South Africa) (FSCA), the Australian Securities and Investments Commission (ASIC) in Australia, and BVI Financial Services Commission (BVI FSC) in the British Virgin Islands for global clients.

markets.com offers web-based and mobile trading with leverage up to 1:300 available to all global clients, whilst those in Europe and UK are subject to ESMA regulations that limit leverage to a maximum of 30:1. With the introduction of ASIC’s lower leverage limits from March 29, 2021, clients in Australia are limited to a maximum of 30:1 leverage for FX trades, 5:1 for Shares and 10:1 for Cryptocurrency trades.

History
markets.com began as GFC Markets and rebranded in 2008 as 'markets.com' – this was done after a merger of GFC Markets' owner Safecap Investments Limited and TradeFX, a developer of software for Forex and CFD operators. In 2015, Playtech fully acquired TradeFX and thus Markets.com for the sum of €458m.

CEO Matan Shvili was one of the co-founders of markets.com in 2008. He stayed at markets.com for nine years as it grew to over 300 employees. Shvili has founded several other businesses but returned to Finalto as Group Commercial Director in 2021, becoming CEO of the consumer division markets.com.

Platforms
markets.com offers accounts for MT4 and MT5 platforms but has since 2015 operated its own proprietary CFD trading platform and has always focused on technology to make trading simpler. Since 2018 there have been a number of major updates to the platform, affecting both the web trading and mobile apps. In 2022 a new app was rebranded and launched, designed to make trading accessible to new traders.

markets.com charts are powered by TradingView, whilst the platform also features news and sentiment tools from TipRanks.

Blends

Blends are markets.com’s proprietary baskets of stocks that are bundled into a single CFD product. These allow traders to take a position on a particular sector or investing theme such as ESG, Social Media and Cannabis.

Licenses / Regulations
The Group has licensed entities by the FCA (UK), ASIC (Australia), CySEC (Cyprus), FSCA (South Africa) and FSC (BVI).

Awards 
Markets.com won the Best Forex Provider of 2017 and the Best FX Platform of 2017 awarded by the UK Forex Awards.

In 2019 markets.com won best forex broker (Runner up) awarded by daytrading.com.

In 2020 markets.com was named Best Forex Trading Platform - Middle East.

References in the Media 
markets.com’s research and analysis is regularly cited in financial media outlets. Chief Market Analyst Neil Wilson’s daily Morning Note is published every morning by the Investors’ Chronicle as ‘The Trader’, whilst it also appears every day on FXStreet.

Wilson has been heavily cited by the press in reference to major market themes such as, most recently, the GameStop trading frenzy of 2021, Tesla’s investment in Bitcoin, the stock market rally of November 2020 following Joe Biden’s election victory and vaccine updates, and the appointment of Mario Draghi as Italy’s prime minister.

Finalto 
markets.com is the business-to-consumer (B2C) division of Finalto, which was previously TradeTech. Finalto was purchased by Gopher Investments in 2022.

The group comprises eight regulated entities focusing on the following brands:

 Finalto Liquidity (formerly CFH)
 Finalto Trading (formerly TradeTech Alpha)
 Finalto 360 (formerly TradeTech360)

References

Foreign exchange companies